The Center of Applied Technology South is a vocational trade school located in the United States in Edgewater, Maryland, behind South River High School. There are 17 technical and traditional programs offered at the Center of Applied Technology South.

History

Cat-South was founded in 1977.

Vocational competitions

Technical Contests
Advertising Design
Architectural Drafting
Automotive Refinishing Technology
Automotive Service Technology
Basic Health Care Skills
Cabinetmaking
Carpentry
CNC Milling Technology
CNC Turning Technology
Collision Repair Technology
Commercial Baking
Computer Maintenance Technology
Computer Technology
Cosmetology
Culinary Arts
Dental Assisting
Food and Beverage Service
Heating, Ventilation, Air Conditioning and Refrigeration
Industrial Motor Control
Internetworking
Marine Service Technology
Mechatronics
Medical Assisting
Nail Care
Nurse Assisting
Practical Nursing
Residential Wiring
Robotics and Automation Technology
Sheet Metal
Technical Computer Applications
Technical Drafting
Web Design
Welding Fabrication
Welding

Occupational Contests
Customer Service
Entrepreneurship
First Aid/CPR
Health Knowledge Bowl
Health Occupations Professional Portfolio
Medical Math
Medical Terminology
Related Technical Math

SkillsUSA

External links
 Home
 Anne Arundel County Public Schools

Education in Anne Arundel County, Maryland
Vocational schools in the United States
Educational institutions established in 1977
1977 establishments in Maryland